Eric Hughes (born 17 October 1950) is a retired English rugby union and professional rugby league footballer who played in the 1960s, 1970s and 1980s, and coached rugby league in the 1980s and 1990s. He unwittingly added confusion to the Canterbury-Bankstown Bulldogs team as he was unrelated but played at the same time as the three Australian brothers named Hughes; Garry, Graeme and Mark.

Background
Eric Hughes' birth was registered in Prescot district, Lancashire, England, he was a pupil at Wade Deacon Grammar School, he was later an English language teacher at Bankfield School, Widnes, and he was the landlord of The Lion public house, Moulton, Cheshire. His older brother Arthur also played rugby league, winning the challenge cup final with Widnes in 1964.

Playing career

International honours
Eric Hughes won caps for England while at Widnes in the 1975 Rugby League World Cup against Wales, France, New Zealand, Australia (sub), Australia, in 1977 against France, in 1978 against France, and Wales, and in 1979 against Wales, and France, and won caps for Great Britain while at Widnes in 1978 against Australia, in 1979 against Australia (3 matches), and New Zealand (3 matches), and in 1982 against Australia.

Challenge Cup Final appearances
Eric Hughes played  in Widnes' 14–7 victory over Warrington in the 1975 Challenge Cup Final during the 1974–75 season at Wembley Stadium, London on Saturday 10 May 1975, in front of a crowd of 85,998, played right-, i.e. number 3, in the 5–20 defeat by St. Helens in the 1976 Challenge Cup Final during the 1975–76 season at Wembley Stadium, London on Saturday 8 May 1976, in front of a crowd of 89,982, played  in the 7–16 defeat by Leeds in the 1977 Challenge Cup Final during the 1976–77 at Wembley Stadium, London on Saturday 7 May 1977, in front of a crowd of 80,871, played  in the 12–3 victory over Wakefield Trinity in the 1979 Challenge Cup Final during the 1978–79 season at Wembley Stadium, London on Saturday 5 May 1979, in front of a crowd of 94,218, the 18–9 victory over Hull Kingston Rovers in the 1981 Challenge Cup Final during the 1980–81 season at Wembley Stadium, London on Saturday 2 May 1981, in front of a crowd of 92,496, played  in the 14-14 draw with Hull F.C. in the 1982 Challenge Cup Final during the 1981–82 season at Wembley Stadium, London on Saturday 1 May 1982, in front of a crowd of 92,147, played  in the 9-18 defeat by Hull F.C. in the 1982 Challenge Cup Final replay during the 1981–82 season at Elland Road, Leeds on Wednesday 19 May 1982, in front of a crowd of 41,171, and played  the 19–6 victory over Wigan in the 1984 Challenge Cup Final during the 1983–84 season at Wembley Stadium, London on Saturday 5 May 1984, in front of a crowd of 80,116.

County Cup Final appearances
Eric Hughes played , and scored a drop goal in Widnes' 6–2 victory over Salford in the 1974 Lancashire County Cup Final during the 1974–75 season at Central Park, Wigan on Saturday 2 November 1974, played  in the 16–7 victory over Salford in the 1975 Lancashire County Cup Final during the 1975–76 season at Central Park, Wigan on Saturday 4 October 1975, played  in the 15–13 victory over Workington Town in the 1978 Lancashire County Cup Final during the 1978–79 season at Central Park, Wigan on Saturday 7 October 1978, played left-, i.e. number 4, in the 11–0 victory over Workington Town in the 1979 Lancashire County Cup Final during the 1979–80 season at The Willows, Salford on Saturday 8 December 1979, played right-, i.e. number 3, in the 3–8 defeat by Leigh in the 1981 Lancashire County Cup Final during the 1981–82 season at Central Park, Wigan on Saturday 26 September 1981, and played right-, i.e. number 3, in the 8–12 defeat by Barrow in the 1983 Lancashire County Cup Final during the 1983–84 season at Central Park, Wigan on Saturday 1 October 1983.

BBC2 Floodlit Trophy Final appearances
Eric Hughes played  in Widnes' 0-5 defeat by Leigh in the 1972 BBC2 Floodlit Trophy Final during the 1972–73 season at Central Park, Wigan on Tuesday 19 December 1972, played right-, i.e. number 3, in the 7-15 defeat by Bramley in the 1973 BBC2 Floodlit Trophy Final during the 1973–74 season at Naughton Park, Widnes on Tuesday 18 December 1973, and played right-, i.e. number 3, in the 13-7 victory over St. Helens in the 1978 BBC2 Floodlit Trophy Final during the 1978–79 season at Knowsley Road, St. Helens on Tuesday 12 December 1978.

Player's No.6 Trophy/John Player/John Player Special Trophy Final appearances
Eric Hughes played  in Widnes' 2-3 defeat by Bradford Northern in the 1974–75 Player's No.6 Trophy Final during the 1974–75 season at Wilderspool Stadium, Warrington on Saturday 25 January 1975, played  in the 19-13 victory over Hull F.C. in the 1975–76 Player's No.6 Trophy Final during the 1975–76 season at Headingley Rugby Stadium, Leeds on Saturday 24 January 1976, played left-, i.e. number 4, in the 4-9 defeat by Warrington in the 1977–78 Players No.6 Trophy Final during the 1977–78 season at Knowsley Road, St. Helens on Saturday 28 January 1978, played  in  the 16-4 victory over Warrington in the 1978–79 John Player Trophy Final during the 1978–79 season at Knowsley Road, St. Helens on Saturday 28 April 1979, played  in the 0-6 defeat by Bradford Northern in the 1979–80 John Player Trophy Final during the 1979–80 season at Headingley Rugby Stadium, Leeds on Saturday 5 January 1980, and played  in the 10-18 defeat by Leeds in the 1983–84 John Player Special Trophy Final during the 1983–84 season at Central Park, Wigan on Saturday 14 January 1984.

Coaching career
Hughes coached Widnes from 1984 to 1985. He resigned following the unforeseen transfer of Joe Lydon to Wigan to alleviate Widnes' financial difficulties, following an approach from Alex Murphy. He returned to playing rugby league signing with St. Helens, and played in 13-matches for St. Helens, winning the first twelve, and then losing the thirteenth, scoring a try in a 22-38 defeat by Leeds in the 1985–86 Rugby League Premiership 1st-round match during the 1985–86 season at Knowsley Road, St. Helens on Sunday 27 April 1986. He coached Rochdale Hornets for the 1987–88 season. He was coach of St. Helens from January 1994 to January 1996. In 1996, he became Football Manager at St. Helens following the appointment of Shaun McRae as coach. He was appointed head coach at Leigh, and was replaced by Keith Latham in early 1997. He went on to coach Wigan Warriors, replacing Graeme West in February 1997.

References

External links
Player Profile at rugby.widnes.tv
Coach statistics at wigan.rlfans.com
Profile at saints.org.uk

1950 births
Living people
Alumni of Edge Hill University
Canterbury-Bankstown Bulldogs players
England national rugby league team players
English rugby league coaches
English rugby league players
Great Britain national rugby league team players
Leigh Leopards coaches
Rochdale Hornets coaches
Rochdale Hornets players
Rugby league centres
Rugby league five-eighths
Rugby league players from Prescot
Rugby league wingers
St Helens R.F.C. coaches
St Helens R.F.C. players
Widnes Vikings coaches
Widnes Vikings players
Wigan Warriors coaches